This is a list of the busiest railway stations in Belgium sorted by the average number of passengers boarding daily on weekdays in 2014. The province is also listed, unless the station lies within the Brussels-Capital Region and therefore does not belong to any province.

The figures include only passenger traffic on national rail services. Numbers for passengers on international trains like Eurostar, Thalys and other high-speed rail services are excluded.

References

Busiest